Erik Ring may refer to:

 Erik Ring (rower) (fl. 1987–1989), German rower
 Erik Ring (footballer) (born 2002), Swedish footballer